The Münchner Lach- und Schießgesellschaft (Munich laughing and shooting company) is a German political kabarett (satirical revue) that runs at its own theatre in Schwabing, Munich.

History 
The event at the Schwabing Alte Laterne was so successful that students were invited to appear twice a week in exchange for a meal and beer. 

The journalist Sammy Drechsel secured Das Stachelschwein as a permanent venue and began to direct the shows. In 1956, the ensemble was named the Münchner Lach- und Schießgesellschaft, a parody of the security firm "Wach- und Schließgesellschaft". Their first program, Denn sie müssen nicht, was sie tun, premiered on 12 December 1956 and was broadcast by the ARD television channel in March 1957.

The ensemble dissolved in 1972. In 1976, a new group was formed in the old tradition. Hildebrandt, Klaus Peter Schreiner and Werner Schneyder wrote scripts until 1980.

Performers 
The kabarett performers included:

 Rainer Basedow (1976–1995)
  (1976–1980)
  (1976–1980)
 Kurt Weinzierl (1976–1980)
 Jochen Busse (1980–1990)
 Bruno Jonas (1981–1984)
  (1983–1984)
  (1985–1990)
  (1985–1993)
  (1991–1999)
 Andreas Rebers (1997–1999)
  (2002–2003)
  (2002–2003)
  (2002–2003)
  (2002–2003)
  (2003–2010)
  (2003–2010)

In 2011, the ensemble dissolved and the theater was used mostly by guest artists.

In 2018, Claudia Jacobacci succeeded Caroline Ebner.

Awards 
 1963: Schwabinger Kunstpreis
 1996: Swiss Kabarett Prize Cornichon

Films 
 1960: Tour de Trance
 1960: Sturm im Wasserglas
 1960: Lampenfieber
 1961: Wähl den, der lügt
 1962: Überleben Sie mal
 1962: Streichquartett
 1963: Halt die Presse
 1964: Krisen-Slalom
 1966: 
 1967: Die Spaßvögel

Videos 
 Halt die Presse, 1963 production, released in 1999
 Krisenslalom, 1963 production, released in 1999
 Schimpf vor 12, 1962 production, released in 1999

Literature 
 Klaus Peter Schreiner: Die Zeit spielt mit. Die Geschichte der Lach- und Schießgesellschaft. Kindler, München 1976  (Rowohlt Taschenbuch, Reinbek bei Hamburg 1978 )
 Till Hofmann (ed.): Verlängert. 50 Jahre Lach- und Schießgesellschaft. Aufgeschrieben von Matthias Kuhn. Blessing, München 2006

References

External links 

 
 
 Münchner Lach- und Schießgesellschaft – Das Kabarett Urgestein prägt bis heute das Haus muenchen-lese.de

German political satire
Culture in Munich
Cabaret in Europe